Luis Esteban Oyarzún Rebolledo (born 24 April 1982) is a Chilean former footballer who played as a defender for several teams in the Primera División de Chile. He both started and finished his professional career with Palestino.

International career
Oyarzún represented Chile at under-20 level in the 2001 FIFA World Youth Championship.

At under-23 level, he represented Chile since 2003 and took part in the 2004 Pre-Olympic Tournament.

References

External links
 
 
 Luis Oyarzún at playmakerstats.com (English version of ceroacero.es)

1982 births
Living people
Chilean people of Basque descent
Footballers from Santiago
Chilean footballers
Chile under-20 international footballers
Chilean Primera División players
Segunda División Profesional de Chile players
Club Deportivo Palestino footballers
Santiago Wanderers footballers
O'Higgins F.C. footballers
Coquimbo Unido footballers
Deportes Melipilla footballers
Rangers de Talca footballers
Association football defenders